Xizhou District, formerly Yibin County is a district of the city of Yibin, Sichuan Province, China, bordering Yunnan province to the south. It is the northernmost county-level division of Yibin.

Towns and townships 
 Shangzhou Town

Counties and districts of Yibin